Ibrahim Khraibut (1913–2003) was a member of the Kuwaiti National Assembly from 1963 to 1979. He ran as an independent and served four consecutive terms. Khraibut represented the first district. He worked as a private businessman and as a pro bono lawyer until being elected to Kuwait's first National Assembly in 1963.

Personal life
Ibrahim Khraibut was the second born son to his father Ali Yousef Al Nasser. He had changed his family last name to Khraibut prior to his campaign for public office as it had become a widely known nickname of members of his branch of the Al-Nasser family part of the Otaibi Tribe and he felt his chances of being elected to the National Assembly would be greater due to the popularity of the Khraibut name at the time. 

Khraibut was married with twenty-four children (eleven sons and thirteen daughters). Prior to being elected into the National Assembly, the MP was a very successful businessman with investments in Kuwait and internationally. Khraibut was known specifically for his success in the industries of construction and real estate, and owned one of largest construction and real estate companies (Al-Warba) in the region.

 Home City: Jabriya, Kuwait
 Religious Views: Muslim 
 Elected member since: 1963
 Elected member for: 4 terms 1963, 1967, 1971, 1975
 Political Orientation: Ruling Family Leaning
 Diwan: Diwan of the Deceased Ibrahim Khraibut located in Jabriya.

Nationalization of oil 
MP Khraibut was instrumental in the nationalization of oil in Kuwait. He introduced the nationalization bill into parliament and pushed for its approval. The nationalization of oil in Kuwait had distinguished it from its gulf neighbors as it involved the separation of oil from the monarchy and put in the name of the people, with the monarch having restricted control.

Constitution of Kuwait
MP. Ibrahim Khraibut had an active role in the formation of the constitution of the State of Kuwait.

References

1913 births
2003 deaths
Members of the National Assembly (Kuwait)
Kuwaiti people of Iranian descent
People from Kuwait City